Events from the year 1911 in Russia.

Incumbents
 Monarch – Nicholas II
 Chairman of the Council of Ministers – Pyotr Stolypin (until 18 September), Vladimir Kokovtsov (starting 22 September)

Events

 4 January - 1911 Kebin earthquake
 18 February - an earthquake in Pamir Mountains blocking the Murghab River by a landslide led to the formation of Sarez Lake
 20 February - , 64 dead, most of them (43) are children
 25 March - murder of Andrei Yushchinsky, a student of the preparatory class of the Kiev Sophia religious school. The authorities (including the Minister of Justice) put pressure on the investigation and contributed to the adoption of a religious-ritual version of the murder. The Jew Mendel Beilis was accused of the crime, but the jury acquitted him. The murder investigation and the ensuing trial, known as the "Beilis case", were widely covered in the Russian and world press.
 7 July - North Pacific Fur Seal Convention of 1911
 14 September - Prime Minister of Russia Pyotr Stolypin assassinated by Dmitry Bogrov in Kiev Opera House
 29 October–23 November - Russian Invasion of Tabriz, 1911
 7 December -  between Russia and China on border demarcation in the Argun River area
 Gleb Kotelnikov invented the knapsack parachute

Births

 1 July - Marshal Sergey Sokolov, minister of Defence of the USSR (1984–1987)
 17 August - Mikhail Botvinnik, 6th World Chess Champion
 8 October - Mark Bernes, singer and actor
 24 October - Arkady Raikin, stand-up comedian

Deaths

 28 March - Mikalojus Čiurlionis, painter and composer of Lithuanian origin
 18 September - Pyotr Stolypin, Prime Minister and Minister of the Interior of the Russian Empire
 5 December - Valentin Serov, painter
 13 December - Nikolay Beketov, physical chemist

References

1911 in Russia
Years of the 20th century in the Russian Empire